Kapatagan, officially the Municipality of Kapatagan (Maranao: Inged a Kapatagan), is a 4th class municipality in the province of Lanao del Sur, Philippines. According to the 2020 census, it has a population of 20,498 people.

Geography

Barangays
Kapatagan is politically subdivided into 15 barangays.
 Bakikis
 Barao
 Bongabong
 Daguan
 Inudaran
 Kabaniakawan
 Kapatagan
 Lusain
 Matimos
 Minimao
 Pinantao.
 Salaman
 Sigayan
 Tabuan
 Upper Igabay

Climate

Demographics

Economy

References

External links
  Kapatagan Profile at the DTI Cities and Municipalities Competitive Index
[ Philippine Standard Geographic Code]
Philippine Census Information
Local Governance Performance Management System

Municipalities of Lanao del Sur